588th may refer to:

588th Bombardment Squadron, inactive United States Air Force unit
588th Night Bomber Regiment or Night Witches, the female military aviators of the 588th Night Bomber Regiment of the Soviet Air Forces

See also
588 (number)
588 (disambiguation)
588, the year 588 (DLXXXVIII) of the Julian calendar
588 BC